The finals and the qualifying heats of the Men's 200 metres Individual Medley event at the 1997 FINA Short Course World Championships were held on the last day of the championships, on Sunday 20 April 1997 in Gothenburg, Sweden.

Finals

Qualifying heats

Remarks

See also
1996 Men's Olympic Games 200m Individual Medley
1997 Men's European LC Championships 200m Individual Medley

References
 Results

M